The Sundance Film Festival (formerly Utah/US Film Festival, then US Film and Video Festival) is an annual film festival organized by the Sundance Institute. It is the largest independent film festival in the United States, with more than 46,660 attending in 2016. It takes place each January in Park City, Utah; Salt Lake City, Utah; and at the Sundance Resort (a ski resort near Provo, Utah), and acts as a showcase for new work from American and international independent filmmakers. The festival consists of competitive sections for American and international dramatic and documentary films, both feature films and short films, and a group of out-of-competition sections, including NEXT, New Frontier, Spotlight, Midnight, Sundance Kids, From the Collection, Premieres, and Documentary Premieres.

History

1978: Utah/US Film Festival 
Sundance began in Salt Lake City in August 1978 as the Utah/US Film Festival in an effort to attract more filmmakers to Utah. It was founded by Sterling Van Wagenen, head of Robert Redford's company Wildwood, and John Earle of the Utah Film Commission. The 1978 festival featured films such as Deliverance, A Streetcar Named Desire, Midnight Cowboy, Mean Streets, and Sweet Smell of Success.
The goal of the festival was to showcase American-made films, highlight the potential of independent film, and increase visibility for filmmaking in Utah. The main focus of the event was to conduct a competition for independent American films, present a series of retrospective films and filmmaker panel discussions, and celebrate the Frank Capra Award. The festival also highlighted the work of regional filmmakers who worked outside the Hollywood system.

In 1979, Sterling Van Wagenen left to head up the first-year pilot program of what became the Sundance Institute, and James W. Ure took over briefly as executive director, followed by Cirina Hampton Catania. More than 60 films were screened at the festival that year, and panels featured many well-known Hollywood filmmakers. Also that year, the first Frank Capra Award went to Jimmy Stewart. The festival also made a profit for the first time. In 1980, Catania left to pursue a production career in Hollywood.

1981: US Film and Video Festival

In 1981, the festival moved to Park City, Utah, and changed the dates from September to January. The move from late summer to midwinter was done by the executive director Susan Barrell with the cooperation of Hollywood director Sydney Pollack, who suggested that running a film festival in a ski resort during winter would draw more attention from Hollywood. It was called the US Film and Video Festival.

1984: Sundance 
In 1984, the now well-established Sundance Institute, headed by Sterling Van Wagenen, took over management of the US Film Festival. Gary Beer and Van Wagenen spearheaded production of the inaugural US Film Festival presented by Sundance Institute (1985), which included Program Director Tony Safford and Administrative Director Jenny Walz Selby. The branding and marketing transition from the US Film Festival to the Sundance Film Festival was managed under the direction of Colleen Allen, Allen Advertising Inc., by appointment of Robert Redford. In 1991, the festival was officially renamed the Sundance Film Festival, after Redford's character the Sundance Kid from the film Butch Cassidy and the Sundance Kid.

The Sundance Film Festival experienced its extraordinary growth in the 1990s, under the leadership of Geoffrey Gilmore and John Cooper, who transformed the venue into the premier festival in the United States, on par of Cannes, Venice, Berlin, and Toronto International Film Festival (also known as The Big Five).  That crucial era is very well documented in Professor Emanuel Levy's book, Cinema of Outsiders: The Rise of American Independent Cinema (NYU Press, 1999, 2001, 2011), the most comprehensive chronicle of Sundance and the Indie movement over the past four decades.

Spin-offs in other locations

Sundance London (2012– )

UK-based publisher C21 Media first revealed in October 2010 that Robert Redford was planning to bring the Sundance Film Festival to London, and in March the following year, Redford officially announced that Sundance London would be held at The O2, in London from April 26 to 29, 2012; the first time it has traveled outside the US.

In a press statement, Redford said, "We are excited to partner with AEG Europe to bring a particular slice of American culture to life in the inspired setting of The O2, and in this city of such rich cultural history. [...] It is our mutual goal to bring to the UK, the very best in current American independent cinema, to introduce the artists responsible for it, and in essence, help build a picture of our country that is broadly reflective of the diversity of voices not always seen in our cultural exports."

The majority of the film screenings, including the festival's premieres, would be held within the Cineworld cinema at The O2 entertainment district. The 2013 Sundance London Festival was held April 25–28, 2013, and sponsored by car-maker Jaguar.

Sundance London 2014 took place on April 25–27, 2014 at the O2 arena; however the 2015 Festival was cancelled in an announcement on January 16, 2015.

Sundance London returned to London from June 2–5, 2016, and again June 1–4, 2017, both at Picturehouse Central in London's West End. The 2018 and 2019 events continued at the same venue.

Films shown at the 2019 event included the controversial dark tale The Nightingale, US comedy Corporate Animals, Lulu Wang's The Farewell (which won the Audience Award) and Sophie Hyde's film based on Emma Jane Unsworth's novel about female friendship, Animals.

The 2020 event in London was postponed due to the impact of the COVID-19 pandemic. It was not rescheduled until July 2021.

Sundance Hong Kong (2014–)
Inaugurated in 2014, Sundance Film Festival: Hong Kong has taken place in 2016, 2017, 2018 and from September 19 to October 1, 2019. It is held at The Metroplex in Kowloon Bay each year. 

The 2020 events in London and Hong Kong were postponed due to impact of the COVID-19 pandemic and as of late 2021 has not been rescheduled.

Sundance at BAM 
From 2006 through 2008, Sundance Institute collaborated with the Brooklyn Academy of Music (BAM) on a special series of film screenings, performances, panel discussions, and special events bringing the institute's activities and the festival's programming to New York City.

Notability 
Many notable independent filmmakers received their big break at Sundance, including Kevin Smith, Robert Rodriguez, Quentin Tarantino, Todd Field, David O. Russell, Steve James, Paul Thomas Anderson, Steven Soderbergh, Darren Aronofsky, James Wan, Edward Burns, and Jim Jarmusch. The festival is also responsible for bringing wider attention to such films as Saw, Garden State, American Psycho, Super Troopers, The Blair Witch Project, Spanking the Monkey, Reservoir Dogs, Primer, In the Bedroom, Better Luck Tomorrow, Little Miss Sunshine, Donnie Darko, El Mariachi, Moon, Clerks, Thank You for Smoking, Sex, Lies, and Videotape, The Brothers McMullen, 500 Days of Summer, Napoleon Dynamite, Whiplash, CODA, and Boyhood.

Three Seasons was the first in festival history to ever receive both the Grand Jury Award and Audience Award, in 1999. Later films that won both awards are: God Grew Tired of Us in 2006 (documentary category), Quinceañera in 2006 (dramatic category), Precious in 2009, Fruitvale (later retitled Fruitvale Station) in 2013, Whiplash in 2014, Me and Earl and the Dying Girl in 2015, The Birth of a Nation in 2016, Minari in 2020, and CODA in 2021.

At the 2016 Sundance Film Festival, three films went on to garner eight Oscar nominations. Manchester by the Sea took the lead in Sundance-supported films with six Oscar nominations, including Best Picture. The next year, about 40 films were acquired by distributors, among them including Amazon, Netflix, Lionsgate, and Universal.

CODA became the first Sundance film to win an Oscar for Best Picture at the 94th Academy Awards.

Growth of the festival 
The festival has changed over the decades from a low-profile venue for small-budget, independent creators from outside the Hollywood system to a media extravaganza for Hollywood celebrity actors, paparazzi, and luxury lounges set up by companies not affiliated with Sundance. Festival organizers have tried curbing these activities in recent years, beginning in 2007 with their ongoing Focus On Film campaign.

The 2009 film Official Rejection documented the experience of small filmmakers trying to get into various festivals in the late 2000s, including Sundance. The film contained several arguments that Sundance had become dominated by large studios and sponsoring corporations. A contrast was made between the 1990s, in which non-famous filmmakers with tiny budget films could get distribution deals from studios like Miramax Films or New Line Cinema, (like Kevin Smith's Clerks), and the 2000s, when major stars with multimillion-dollar films (like The Butterfly Effect with Ashton Kutcher) dominated the festival. Kevin Smith doubted that Clerks, if made in the late 2000s, would be accepted to Sundance.

Numerous small festivals sprung up around Sundance in the Park City area, including Slamdance, Nodance, Slumdance, It-dance, X-Dance, Lapdance, Tromadance, The Park City Film Music Festival, etc., though all except Slamdance are no longer held.

Included in the Sundance changes made in 2010, a new programming category titled "NEXT" (often denoted simply by the characters "<=>", which mean "less is more") was introduced to showcase innovative films that are able to transcend the confines of an independent budget. Another recent addition was the Sundance Film Festival USA program, in which eight of the festival's films are shown in eight different theaters around the United States.

The total economic benefits Sundance brings to Utah is estimated to be $167 million in 2020. 

The 44th went virtual for the first time in 2021.

Directors 
 Geoff Gilmore – 1991–2009
 John Cooper – 2009–2020
 Tabitha Jackson – 2020–2022

See also 
 List of Sundance Film Festival award winners
 List of Sundance Film Festival selections
 Sundance Channel

References

Further reading
 Anderson, John. Sundancing: Hanging Out And Listening In At America's Most Important Film Festival. Harper Paperbacks, 2000.
 Biskind, Peter. Down and Dirty Pictures: Miramax, Sundance, and the Rise of Independent Film. Simon & Schuster, 2004.
 Craig, Benjamin. Sundance – A Festival Virgin's Guide: Surviving and Thriving at America's Most Important Film Festival. Cinemagine Media Publishing, 3rd ed., 2016, .
 Levy, Emanuel. Cinema of Outsiders: The Rise of American Independent Cinema. NYU Press, 1999, 1st ed, 2001, 2nd ed 2011,3 ed.
 Smith, Lory. Party in a Box: The Story of the Sundance Film Festival . Gibbs Smith Publishers, 1999.
 
 
von Roon, Alexander. "Grass and dark Tunnels: Sundance is a Marketing-Tool for the US Film Industry", Berliner Zeitung 2000.
 Sundance Film Festival 1985–1996 
 Sundance – A Festival Virgin's Guide – full history and how to attend the festival.

External links

 

 
Film festivals established in 1978
Film festivals in Utah
Tourist attractions in Summit County, Utah
Tourist attractions in Salt Lake City
Tourist attractions in Weber County, Utah
1978 establishments in Utah
Annual events in Utah